Clarence Brown was a professional baseball pitcher in the Negro leagues. He played with the Kansas City Monarchs in 1941.

References

External links
 and Seamheads

Kansas City Monarchs players
Year of birth missing
Year of death missing
Baseball pitchers